Stephen Hector Youssef Doueihi (born June 25, 1927 in Zgharta, Greater Lebanon, Lebanon - died on December 17, 2014) was a bishop of the Maronite Church in the United States. He served as the eparch (bishop) of the Maronite Catholic Eparchy of Saint Maron of Brooklyn from 1997 to 2004.

Biography
Born in Zgharta, Lebanon, Doueihi was ordained priest on August 14, 1955 to the Maronite Catholic Eparchy of Batroun. In 1972 Doueihi incardinated himself in the Maronite Catholic Eparchy of Saint Maron of Brooklyn. Pope John Paul II named him as the Bishop of Saint Maron of Brooklyn on November 11, 1996. He was ordained a bishop by Cardinal Nasrallah Boutros Sfeir, Maronite Patriarch of Antioch, on January 11, 1997. The principal co-consecrators were Bishop Emeritus Francis Zayek of Brooklyn and Archeparch Joseph Mohsen Béchara of Antelias. Doueihi served as the eparch until his resignation was accepted by Pope John Paul II on January 10, 2004. He died on December 17, 2014.

References

External links
Bishop Estephan-Hector Doauihy on Ehden Family Tree Website

1927 births
Lebanese clergy
20th-century Maronite Catholic bishops
21st-century Maronite Catholic bishops
American Eastern Catholic bishops
Lebanese-American Maronite Catholic bishops
2014 deaths
Lebanese emigrants to the United States
People from Zgharta
20th-century American clergy
21st-century American clergy